Alexey Valeryevich Erokhov (born 5 September 1999) is a Russian figure skater. He is the 2018 Junior World champion, the 2017 JGP Belarus champion, the 2017 JGP Poland champion, and the 2018 Russian junior national champion.

Personal life 
Erokhov was born on 5 September 1999 in Moscow. As of April 2018, he is a student at Moscow's Institute for Physiculture.

Career

Early career 
Erokhov began learning to skate in 2003. Ilia Klimkin coached him at Moscow's CSKA Sports School until 2011; Erokhov then transferred to Sambo 70 School, also in Moscow, and began to be coached by Eteri Tutberidze and Sergei Dudakov.

He placed 12th at the 2016 Russian Junior Championships.

2016–2017 season 
Erokhov's international debut came in September 2016 at a 2016–17 ISU Junior Grand Prix (JGP) competition in Yokohama, Japan, where he won the bronze medal. Due to an injury, he withdrew from his second JGP assignment, in Germany, following the short program.

Erokhov finished 10th competing on the senior level at the 2017 Russian Championships in December 2016 and 5th at the junior event in February 2017.

2017–2018 season 
Erokhov won his first international title in September at the 2017 JGP event in Minsk, Belarus. Ranked first in both segments, he outscored the silver medalist, Andrew Torgashev, by more than 20 points. He attained his personal best total score, 232.79 points, at that competition. After winning gold in Gdańsk, Poland, he qualified to the JGP Final in Nagoya, Japan, where he placed 5th.

At the 2018 Russian Championships, Erokhov placed 8th at the senior event in December 2017 and took gold at the junior event in January 2018.

In March 2018, he won gold at the 2018 World Junior Championships in Sofia, Bulgaria. He ranked second in the short program, behind Alexei Krasnozhon, who later withdrew, and first in the free skate, outscoring the silver medalist, his teammate Artur Danielian, by more than 12 points.

2018–2019 season 
Erokhov was supposed to start his season at the Ondrej Nepela Trophy but withdrew due to injury. He competed at the Finlandia Trophy in October, where he was placed seventh. Afterward, he withdrew from both his GP events - the Rostelecom Cup and the Grand Prix of Helsinki. He also withdrew from the 2019 Russian Nationals. He competed at the 2019 Russian Junior Nationals and placed fourth. He was named to the 2019 World Junior Figure Skating Championships but later withdrew.

2019–2020 season 
Still dealing with an injury, Erokhov only competed in one competition - the Russian Cup Final, where he placed twelfth.

2020–2021 season 
In July, it was announced that he was changing coaches from longtime coaches Eteri Tutberidze and Sergei Dudakov to Viktoria Butsaeva. He was sixth at the second stage of the Russian Cup in Moscow and won bronze at the fifth stage, also in Moscow. This qualified him for the National Championships in Chelyabkinsk. However, he later withdrew from the competition.

2021–2022 season 
Returning to international competition, Erokhov placed eighth at the 2021 CS Warsaw Cup. At the 2022 Russian Championships he finished in seventh place.

Programs

Competitive highlights 
GP: Grand Prix; CS: Challenger Series; JGP: Junior Grand Prix

Detailed results

Senior level

Junior level 

Small medals for short and free programs awarded only at ISU Championships.

References

External links 
 

1999 births
Russian male single skaters
World Junior Figure Skating Championships medalists
Living people
Figure skaters from Moscow